Laraine Day (born La Raine Johnson, October 13, 1920 – November 10, 2007) was an American actress, radio and television commentator, and  former Metro-Goldwyn-Mayer (MGM) contract star. As a leading lady, she was paired opposite major film stars, including Robert Mitchum, Lana Turner, Cary Grant, Ronald Reagan, Kirk Douglas, and John Wayne. As well as her numerous film and television roles, she acted on stage, conducted her own radio and television shows, and wrote two books. Owing to her marriage to Leo Durocher and her involvement with his baseball career, she was known as the "First Lady of Baseball". Her best-known films include Foreign Correspondent, My Son, My Son, Journey for Margaret, Mr. Lucky, The Locket, and the Dr. Kildare series.

Early life and education
Born La Raine Johnson in Roosevelt, Utah, on October 13, 1920, she was one of eight children in a wealthy family who were members of the Church of Jesus Christ of Latter-day Saints (LDS Church). Her parents were Clarence Irwin Johnson and Ada M. Johnson. Her father was a grain dealer and an interpreter for the Ute Indian tribes. She had a twin brother, Lamar. Her great-grandfather was early Mormon pioneer Charles C. Rich. The family later moved to California, where she began her acting career with the Long Beach Players, including her friend and contemporary Robert Mitchum. She attended George Washington Junior High School and was a 1938 graduate of Polytechnic High School in Long Beach, California.

Career

After a talent scout spotted her with the Long Beach Players, she signed a contract with Goldwyn studios, for which she made her cinematic debut. In 1937, Day debuted on screen in a bit part in Stella Dallas. Her contract was dropped shortly thereafter because she "lacked talent". Shortly afterwards, she won lead roles at RKO Pictures in several George O'Brien Westerns, in which she was billed as Laraine Johnson. In 1938, she adopted the name "Laraine Day" to honor her previous playhouse manager Elias Day, from whom she had received much of her training. During that time, she was active in establishing a playhouse in Los Angeles for Mormon actors. Ray Bradbury joined for a period of time in 1939, and she let him do some stage prop work and publicity.

In 1939, she signed with MGM, becoming popular and well known (billed as Laraine Day) as Nurse Mary Lamont, the title character's love interest and eventual fiancée in a string of seven Dr. Kildare movies beginning with Calling Dr. Kildare (1939), with Lew Ayres in the title role.

Her roles for other studios were often far more stimulating than those MGM gave her, including a prominent supporting part in the Irish melodrama My Son, My Son! (1940). She also starred in the Alfred Hitchcock thriller Foreign Correspondent (1940) with Joel McCrea and the psychological mystery The Locket (1946) with Robert Mitchum, Brian Aherne, and Gene Raymond. In 1941, she was voted the number one "star of tomorrow" in Hollywood.  Also in 1941, she was Ronald Reagan's leading lady in the Western comedy The Bad Man starring top-billed Wallace Beery and Lionel Barrymore. That same year, she made her stage debut opposite Gregory Peck in the national theater tour of Angel Street. 
She was released from her contract with MGM in May 1946, of her own discretion, and signed a contract with RKO in December of that year. The contract stated that she would make one film a year for five years, earning $100,000 per film. Throughout her film career, she was paired opposite major film stars, including Lana Turner, Cary Grant, and John Wayne. In the 1940s, she made guest appearances on radio in both Lux Radio Theatre and The Screen Guild Theater.

In May 1951, she began hosting a television show alternately called Daydreaming with Laraine and The Laraine Day Show. In May 1952, she was signed to a midnight-to-3 am interview series with New York radio station WMGM featuring interviews related to politics, show business, and sports. She also made stage appearances in Lost Horizon, the 1973 revival of The Women, and a revival of The Time of the Cuckoo.

Personal life

Laraine Day's first marriage was to James Ray Hendricks, a dance-band singer-turned-airport executive for the Santa Monica airport, on May 16, 1942. The couple adopted three children: Christopher, Angela, and Michelle. Day filed for divorce from Hendricks in December 1946. Day was granted an interlocutory divorce from Hendricks on January 20, 1947, which required her to wait one year before remarrying.

On January 21, 1947, Day traveled to Juarez, Mexico, where she received a second divorce decree. Later that day, she traveled to El Paso, Texas, where she married baseball manager Leo Durocher. Upon returning to California, the judge who granted Day's interlocutory divorce from Hendricks stated that the Mexican divorce she received was not legal, and since she failed to wait the one-year period for her divorce to become final, deemed her Texas marriage illegal, as well. After waiting a little over a year, Day and Durocher remarried on February 16, 1948, in Santa Monica, California. After the couple moved to New York, Day read every book about baseball she could to understand the game. She became the first woman to be honored by the New York chapter of the Baseball Writers Association at their annual dinner in 1951. During her marriage to Durocher, Day was often referred to as the "First Lady of Baseball". While Durocher was managing the New York Giants, she wrote the book Day With the Giants (1952).  She was also the host of Day With the Giants, a 15-minute television interview program broadcast before New York Giants home games. Day and Durocher divorced in June 1960.

On March 7, 1961, Day married television producer Michael Grilikhes, with whom she had two daughters, Dana Laraine (born November 13, 1962) and Gigi (born October 6, 1964).

Religion
Laraine Day was a member of the LDS Church. Throughout her life, she never swore, smoked, or drank any kind of alcohol, coffee, or tea. Until her death in 2007, she retained her Mormon faith, stating, "It brings me comfort in a confusing world." In 1961, she appeared with the Mormon Tabernacle Choir in their production of Let Freedom Ring, which was an inspirational one-hour program dedicated to the spirit of American Freedom.

Politics
Laraine Day was, as she described herself, "very much a Republican". She was a vocal supporter of Richard Nixon, whom she later met at the 1968 Republican National Convention, citing him as the type who would "go out of his way to help the American people". She also supported Dwight D. Eisenhower in 1952 and longtime Hollywood friend and former co-star Ronald Reagan in the 1980 and 1984 presidential elections, saying of both Nancy Reagan and him adoringly, "Ronald Reagan makes me proud to be an American. His intelligence, capability, and Christian brotherhood are so inspiring and his way of leadership is just superb. I consider myself lucky to have been his leading lady in The Bad Man and a short-subject reel and as a nation all together we are beyond fortunate to have the leadership of such fine people as the Reagans."

Later years and death
In October 1960, Laraine Day appeared in the Nixon–Lodge Bumper Sticker Motorcade Campaign in Los Angeles along with Ginger Rogers, Cesar Romero, Irene Dunne, Dick Powell, Mary Pickford, and John Payne. In the 1970s, she was the spokesperson for the Make America Better campaign and traveled across the country sharing her views on environmental issues. In 1971, she wrote a book called The America We Love. Day moved back to her native Utah in March 2007 following the death of her third husband. She died at the home of her daughter, Gigi Bell, in Ivins, Utah, from undisclosed causes on November 10, 2007. She was 87 years old. Her body was taken back to California, and on November 15, 2007, a memorial service was held at Forest Lawn Memorial Park in the Hollywood Hills.

Legacy
During World War II the Royal Canadian Air Force 427 Lion Squadron had been "adopted" by MGM. Many of the aircraft had dedications or nose art honoring MGM's Stars.
A Handley-Page Halifax bomber "Yehudi" DK226 ZL Y carried the name of Laraine Day into battle over Germany. For her contribution to the motion picture industry, Laraine Day has a star on the Hollywood Walk of Fame at 6676 Hollywood Blvd.

Filmography
All film and television appearances come from Internet Movie Database (IMDb) and Turner Classic Movies.

Further reading
 "How A Mormon Girl, Laraine Day, Conquered Hollywood by Faith!" by May Mann in Screenland

References

External links

 
 
 
 Obituary, The Times, 16 November 2007
 Obituary, ThisIsAnnouncements.co.uk, 10 November 2007
 
Laraine Day papers, L. Tom Perry Special Collections, Harold B. Lee Library, Brigham Young University
Laraine Day historical clothing, L. Tom Perry Special Collections, Harold B. Lee Library, Brigham Young University

1920 births
2007 deaths
20th-century American actresses
Actresses from Utah
American film actresses
Latter Day Saints from New York (state)
20th-century American memoirists
American radio actresses
American stage actresses
American television actresses
American television talk show hosts
Articles containing video clips
Burials at Forest Lawn Memorial Park (Hollywood Hills)
Metro-Goldwyn-Mayer contract players
People from Roosevelt, Utah
Actresses from Los Angeles
American twins
Western (genre) film actresses
California Republicans
RKO Pictures contract players
Latter Day Saints from California
Latter Day Saints from Utah
New York (state) Republicans
Utah Republicans
20th-century American women writers
American women memoirists
Harold B. Lee Library-related film articles
21st-century American women
Long Beach Polytechnic High School alumni